Big White Duel II is a Hong Kong television medical drama produced by TVB. It stars Roger Kwok, Kenneth Ma, Moses Chan, Nancy Wu, Natalie Tong and Kelly Cheung. Marco Law serves as the producer. It is the sequel to the 2019 drama Big White Duel.

The drama made its premiere on Youku on 22 June 2022.

Cast and characters

Marshall Paxton Hospital

Senior Management

Neuroendovascular Surgery (NES)

Cardiothoracic Surgery (CTS)

Accident & Emergency (A&E)

Oncology

Nursing

Other cast

References

Hong Kong television series
2020s medical television series
TVB original programming